Montecristo is a Spanish-language telenovela that aired on TV Azteca. It premiered on August 14, 2006. The final original episode aired  April 27, 2007. It is based on the 2006 Argentinian telenovela of the same name, with Rita Fusaro, one of the producer of the original version, serving as the producer in this version.

Story
Montecristo is the story of Santiago Diaz Herrera (Diego Olivera), a young man who apparently seems to have it all: love, a future, family, success. Life has been kind to him, the doors of the whole world are opened to him. But the treachery of those around him will turn everything into hell.

Santiago, the son of an outstanding national judge, has just been appointed secretary of the court. He has plans to marry Laura, the woman of his dreams.

Santiago feels a great devotion for law; but he also loves fencing, a passion he shares with Marcos Lombardo (Omar Germenos), his close friend. The story begins when Santiago and Marcos travel to Morocco to take part in a fencing tournament. However, this trip will not lead him to victory but to sheer disgrace since he will be involved in a terrible act of treachery, plotted by a wicked environment.

Some days before setting off, Santiago receives some tragic news; his father, Horacio Diaz Herrera(Jose Alonso), discovers that Alberto Lombardo (Marcos' father) has committed a very serious crime during the times of the military regime in Mexico for which he will be arrested and taken to court. Santiago gets so distressed by this terrible news that he decides not to say a word to Marcos. But he doesn't take into account Luciano's envious essence, a man that had unsuccessfully tried to get Santiago's position, and who is fully convinced that the judge, his superior, has helped his son reach his post at court. Alberto Lombardo (Fernando Lujan), a man trained to do evil, asks his son Marcos to get rid of Santiago while they are in Europe, as he will do the same with Horacio in Mexico.

Almost immediately, Judge Herrera dies in a terrible accident caused by Leandro, Laura's uncle (Santiago's fiancée) and Alberto's accomplice. He also plots a setup to involve Santiago in his father's death. For this reason, Santiago is arrested in Morocco, accused of a crime he has not committed. Marcos returns from Europe alone and makes Laura believe that Santiago has killed a man. Laura(Silvia Navarro) gets desperate and tries by all means to travel to Morocco but she is told that Santiago has been killed in jail. Laura falls into a terrible depression and decides to put an end to her life. But she also finds out that she is expecting a baby from Santiago. Feeling devastated and totally at a loss, she agrees to marry Marcos, who has always loved her in silence.

In the meantime, in a far-off jail in Morocco, Santiago meets Ulises (Alfredo Sevilla), an old art dealer that has been in prison for many years. Ulises helps Santiago recover. Together, they discover Marcos' treachery. From then on, Santiago has only one thing on mind: to take revenge on those who have snatched his happiness and life.

Cast and Characters 

 Silvia Navarro - Laura Ledezma
 Diego Olivera - Santiago Díaz Herrera
 Omar Germenos - Marcos Lombardo Riverol
 Fernando Luján - Alberto Lombardo Gutiérrez
 Maria Reneé Prudencio - Regina Pointer Arciniegas
 José Alonso - Horacio Díaz Herrera Guzmán
 Julieta Egurrola - Sara Calleja
 Margarita Sanz - Leticia Riverol De Lombardo
 Luis Felipe Tovar - Ramón
 Álvaro Guerrero - Leandro
 Leticia Huijara - Dolores "Lola" Carreño
 Pedro Sicard - Luciano Manzur
 Carmen Delgado - Helena
 Sophie Alexander - Mariana
 Tania Arredondo - Milena Salcedo
 Francisco Balzeta - Detective
 Sebastián Ferrat - Camilo
 Michelle Garfías
 Carlos Hays - Matías Lombardo Ledezma / Matías Díaz Herrera Ledezma 
 Víctor Hugo Martín - León Rocamora
 Raúl Ortíz - Doctor
 María Fernanda Quiroz - Érika
 Manuel Sevilla - Petricio Tamargo
 René Gatica - Padre Pedro
 Lisset - Diana/Lorena
 Sergio de Bustamante - Andrés
 Erika de la Rosa - Valentina Lombardo Riverol
 Lola Merino - Lysi Savoy
 Enrique Muñoz - Clementi
 Ana Karina Guevara - Ana Medina
 Julia Urbini - Rias Lombardo Riverol
 Rodolfo Almada - Jaime
 Hernán Mendoza 
 Fernando Sarfatti - Juan
 Edna Necoechea
 Carmen Madrid - Mercedes Cortés

Syndication
ntv7 (August 8, 2008 to May 2009)

2006 telenovelas
2006 Mexican television series debuts
2007 Mexican television series endings
Mexican telenovelas
TV Azteca telenovelas
Television shows based on The Count of Monte Cristo
Mexican television series based on Argentine television series
Spanish-language telenovelas